The Founding of a Republic is a Chinese historical drama produced in 2009 to mark the 60th anniversary of the People's Republic of China and was made to portray the final years of the Chinese Communist Revolution that followed the end of the Second Sino-Japanese War (1937-1945). This film was co-directed by Huang Jianxin and Han Sanping, and includes many famous actors such as Andy Lau, Ge You, as well as other directors such as Jiang Wen, and Chen Kaige. The main protagonists Mao Zedong and Chiang Kai-shek were played by highly renowned actors, Tang Guoqiang and Zhang Guoli. One of the purposes of this movie aside from reenacting the events of the Chinese Communist Revolution was to also attract a younger audience to view films that revolved around government propaganda, which they aim to accomplish by including famous actors that would draw the attention of the youth. According to the executive at one of China's top multiplex chains, this film is also unique because the film unusually marries "the core of an 'ethically inspiring' film with commercial packaging.".
Additionally, this is the first zhuxuanlu (主旋律; i.e. propaganda) film to work solely with cinematic audio-visual methods to achieve its political and ideological goals. It is a milestone in that since its production in 2009, the distinction between zhuxuanlu and commercial film has become blurred; they have become primarily indistinguishable from each other. This film was released on September 16, 2009, in mainland China and during its release, it had a tremendous amount of support from the Communist Party.

Plot
In 1945 after the end of the Second Sino-Japanese War, Mao Zedong and other members of the Communist Party of China (CPC) travel to Chongqing to meet with Chiang Kai-shek and the Kuomintang (KMT). This meeting aims to consider a peace negotiation between the two parties and hopefully discuss the beginning of a democratic nation. With assistance from the China Democratic League, Mao Zedong and Chiang Kai-shek signed the Double Tenth Agreement on October 10, 1945. Both parties agreed to halt the civil war and establish a multi-party government within China.

The following year, the Nationalist government relocated to Nanjing (Nanking), and the KMT broke the Double Tenth Agreement, which led the civil war to resume. In July 1947 and onwards, the People's Liberation Army changed its tactics from strategic defense to offense into regions under KMT rule, beginning the process of liberating China. During this time, Chiang Kai-shek called for a National Assembly in Nanjing, where he was elected as the first President of the Republic of China (ROC). His elected vice president was Li Zongren, a known rival within the party. In May 1948, the CPC declared the opening of a "War of Liberation" against Chiang's ROC government, with many other political parties responding to the call and taking the CPC's side, including the China Democratic League, the Revolutionary Committee (China) and other political figures such as Zhang Lan, Soong Ching-ling and Li Jishen. After numerous victories for the CPC within China's central and southern sectors, Chiang Kai-shek is forced to resign as president, and his forces retreat to Taiwan in December 1949. On October 1, 1949, Mao declared the founding of the People's Republic of China, with Beijing, formally named Beiping, as its capital, marking the start of a new era for China.

Production 
The Founding of a Republic, is a historical drama that is shot in many locations including Tianjin, Beijing, Shanghai, and Nanjing to re-create historical events during the Chinese Communist Revolution. The production of this film was commissioned by China's film regulator, the China Film Administration (CFA), and was produced by the publicly funded China Film Group (CFG). This film was co-directed by Huang Jianxin and Han Sanping, the chairman of the China Film Group, and includes many famous actors including Andy Lau, Ge You, Hu Jun, Leon Lai, Zhang Ziyi, Donnie Yen, Jackie Chan, Jet Li, Zhao Wei, as well as other directors such as Jiang Wen, Chen Kaige, and John Woo. The main protagonists were played by highly renowned actors, Tang Guoqiang and Zhang Guoli, who played Mao Zedong and Chiang Kai-shek. One interesting aspect of this film was that a CFH spokesman revealed that many of the stars that appeared in the film waived their fee, which kept the film's budget quite modest. The initial budget of the film was 30 million Yuan (US$4.7 million),  however, the finalized cost was 60-70 million Yuan, which is the equivalent of US 8.8-10 million dollars.

Critical response

Positive responses 
The film was a massive financial success in mainland China, earning 420 million yuan and eventually becoming the highest-grossing Chinese-made film ever for a brief time until it was surpassed the following year by Jiang Wen’s Let the Bullets Fly (2010).

Many critics also recognized how The Founding of a Republic has evolved public state-narrated presentation of past historical figures and events. For example, many applauded the film for its more “objective” retelling of some characters, such as Chiang Kai-shek, who is characterized in a more sympathetic light compared to past movies. As Gloria and M.E. Davies have emphasized, many online commentators, “praised the film's makers for departing from former 'good vs. evil' representations of Mao and Chiang to emphasize instead the contingencies of war that led the Communists to victory”. Similarly, the film was commended by viewers for its amplified representation of other minority party leaders, such as Zhang Lan, Chairman of the China Democratic League, for the demonstrated significance of their role in the nation's foundation.

Negative responses 
Even though the film made some efforts to highlight history as an honest struggle for democracy, many other commentators felt disappointed that the movie offered a distorted revisionist theme of the nation's history and the CCP’s full politics. As G and M.E. Davies highlighted, the film seemed to be more focused on presenting a “historical romp rather than a disciplined treatment of the subject”. Further critics such as the former editor of the Southern Weekend, Chiang Ping, have called out the film for highlighting “the limits of the contemporary Party-guided commercial repackaging of Chinese history”.

Eventually, the Chinese film rating site Douban had to disable the rating feature for The Founding of a Republic, as well as the other films within the trilogy, because of their negative impact.

In response to some reactions outside Mainland China, Huang Jianxin, the film's co-director, "has said it was unfair to describe The Founding of a Republic as propaganda since modern Chinese audience was too sophisticated to swallow a simplistic rendering of history."

Cast

Main figures

Chinese Communist Party figures

Kuomintang figures

China Democratic League figures

Other notable historical figures

Foreign political figures

Fictional characters

Controversy surrounding actors' nationalities 
Before the release of the film, news had circulated that 21 actors in the film, including Chen Kaige and Chen Hong, are foreign nationals. Particularly due to the film's popularity and connection to the sixtieth anniversary of the People's Republic of China, this controversy quickly attracted large media attention.

Some critics, such as Shanghai writer Han Han, have pointed to the film's strong nationalist themes to highlight the irony of foreign nationals' involvement, especially when understanding how “the communist ideals of the film might translate into today’s world”. On September 17, 2009, National Radio and Television Administration (NRTA) spokesman Zhu Hong formally stated that Tang Guoqiang and the other ten main actors of The Founding of a Republic are in fact Chinese nationals. Zhu Hong said in a question-and-answer session that the other actors in the film were all guest stars, and the vast majority were Chinese nationals, thus assuring that the film is in line with the "regulations for employing foreign creators to participate in the filming of domestic films" and that the main actors in Chinese films do not exceed one-third of the provisions of foreign personnel.

Award and nominations

Trivia 

 When asked in an interview why he made the film, director Han Sanping said, "When Zhang Heping (former vice chairman of the Beijing Committee of the Chinese People's Political Consultative Conference) called me, he wanted me to direct the film, and he gave many reasons. But what finally convinced me was that he said, ‘It's the 60th anniversary of the founding of New China, so I should really come to the front line to give a little power and leave a memento.’ Finally, the leaders of the Film Administration and Zhao Shi, deputy director of the General Administration, decided to let me be the general director and do my best to make the film." At the same time, he said, "Now if I were to categorize The Founding of a Republic, I would say it is a Chinese ‘heroic epic film’.”
 After filming The Soong Sisters, Wu Junmei had resolved never to play Soong Mei-ling again. One important reason was that when she views the finished film and saw that the scenes "Xi'an Incident" and "Congress Speech" were cut, Wu Junmei felt that the character of Soong Mei-ling in the film had deviated from the script she had seen at the beginning. In addition, she felt Soong Mei-ling is a very difficult character, to an extent that she "grows more unconfident as the filming progresses". However, after 12 years of accumulating life experience, she reprised her role as Soong Mei-ling in The Founding of a Republic.
 This is the 14th time that Tang Guoqiang has played Mao Zedong on the screen since 1996. Tang Guoqiang was 56 years old when the film was shot, and Mao Zedong was exactly 56 years old in 1949. After many years, Tang is very much in Mao's element, both in terms of temperament and image.

See also 
 The Founding of a Party
 The Founding of an Army

References

External links
 
 
 The Founding of a Republic at the Chinese Movie Database
 Why Should 2009 Make a Difference? Reflections on a Chinese Blockbuster
 The Founding of a Republic - Far East Films

2009 films
2000s Mandarin-language films
Chinese historical films
2009 drama films
Films directed by Huang Jianxin
Chinese propaganda films
DMG Entertainment films
China Film Group Corporation films
Cultural depictions of Mao Zedong
Cultural depictions of Zhou Enlai
Cultural depictions of Chiang Kai-shek
Cultural depictions of Deng Xiaoping
Cultural depictions of Joseph Stalin